George Bowser and Rick Blue (real name Richard Elger), better known as Bowser and Blue, are a musical duo from Montreal who write and perform comedic songs. Their material ranges from absurdist humor ("I've Got a Great Big Dick", "Canadian Psychedelic Snowboarding Team", "I'm in Like with a Dyke Named Spike") to pointed political and cultural satire ("You Should Speak French", "Driving in Quebec", "Bouchard's Speech", "Clinton's Thing", "Rappin' Rambo").

History
Elger spent the 1960s performing folk music in coffee houses, and played in two bands: Mantis, and The British North American Act. He met singer/songwriter George Bowser, also a long-time member of the Montreal music scene, and they began performing as a duo in 1978. Their first gig was at Montreal's Irish Lancer pub, but comedy clubs were becoming very popular and the duo discovered their comedic talent early in the 1980s. They then went on a North American tour as the opening band for Katrina and the Waves; that tour introduced them to the college market. In 1986, they were signed to Justin Time Records and released their first album, Bowser & Blue, which featured contributions from Katrina and the Waves members Kimberley Rew, Alex Cooper and Vince de la Cruz, as well as Supertramp frontman Rick Davies.

In 1988, they appeared on Just For Laughs, and began appearing weekly, and performing political satire, on the CTV Television Network show Fighting Back. Their specific appeal was the humorous defense of English-speaking Quebecers, at a time when Quebec nationalism was at its peak. They also began regularly entertaining snowbirds in the US, They began staging theatrical shows, notably at Montreal's Centaur Theatre and, from 2007 to 2012, headlined the Canadian Snowbird Extravaganza concert series.

In 1991, they formed their own label, You Guys Publishing. Their 1997 national Christmas special A Bowser and Blue Comedy Christmas: Two Nuts Roasting On An Open Fire, garnered a nomination for Best Performance or Host in a Variety Program or Series at the Gemini Awards of 1998.

They continue to perform and travel extensively across Canada and, on July 1, 2020, performed a Canada Day Virtual Covid Concert during the COVID-19 pandemic. In October 2021, with Josh Freed, Terry Mosher and Ellen David, they created the show Four Anglos Surviving the COVID Apocalypse. In 2022, they released the album Hindsight, which addresses aspects of the pandemic.

Discography

Albums
 Bowser & Blue (1986), Justin Time
 Is It In Yet? (1987), Justin Time
 The Lovely & Talented Bowser & Blue (1989), Justin Time
 Westmount Rhodesians (1990), Justin Time
Bowser & Blue Live (1991), You Guys
 Bowser & Blue At The Comedy Nest (1995), You Guys
 Montréal Souvenirs (1996), You Guys
 Troubadors (1996), You Guys
 Crackpots (1997), You Guys
 Bowser and Blue 20th Anniversary (1998), You Guys 
 We're All Here... (1999), You Guys 
 Red Guitars: Music for Misguided Angels (1999), You Guys
 She Wants Me (2001), You Guys
 The Illustrated Canadian Songbook (2003)
Pull My Finger (2007), You Guys
 No Ordinary Dummies (2008), You Guys
 Live At The Cock And Bull Pub (2011), You Guys
Schwartz's The Musical (2011), You Guys 
Openly Grey (2015), You Guys
Hindsight (2022), You Guys

DVDs
 We're All Here... (1999), You Guys
Humor for Boomers (2009), You Guys
Bowser & Blue Tube (2013), You Guys

Singles
"It Ain't Easy Being White" / "Polka Dot Undies" 
"Rappin' Rambo" / "Writing My Name in the Snow" 
 "The BP Song" 
 "Everything Is Cheaper in the States" 
 "The Senator's Song" 
 "Snow Is a Four-Letter Word"
 "That's Progress"

Television Specials

 Blokes (1993), CFCF-DT, CBC Newsworld
 La Fête Carrée (A Woodstock For Squareheads) (1996), CFCF-DT
 Something Bowser, Something Blue (1996), CFCF-DT
 Full Frontal Unity (1997), CTV Television Network - national
 A Bowser and Blue Comedy Christmas: Two Nuts Roasting on an Open Fire (1997), CTV Television Network
 Two Smart Fellers (1998), CFCF-DT
 We're All Here (Because We're Not All There) (1999), CFCF-DT
 She Wants Me (To Go Away) (2000), CFCF-DT

Theatre Shows

 Blokes (1992), Centaur Theatre, Montréal
 The Best of Bowser and Blue (1993), The Piggery Theatre, North Hatley, Québec
 Blokes Deux (1994), Centaur Theatre
 Something Bowser, Something Blue (1995), Theatre Lac-Brome, Lac-Brome, Québec
 Troubadours Through Time (1996), Centaur Theatre
 Mainly Montréal (1997), (with David Fennario and Vittorio Rossi), Centaur Theatre
 La Fête Carrée (a Woodstock for Squareheads) (1997) Just for Laughs Comedy Festival, Montréal
 Two Smart Fellers (1998), Theatre Lac-Brome
 We're All Here (Because We're Not All There) (2000), Theatre Lac-Brome
 A Pile of Hits (2001), Theatre Lac-Brome
 The Two and Only (2002), Hudson Village Theatre, Hudson, Quebec
 The Paris of America (2003), Centaur Theatre
 The 4 Anglos of the Apocalypse (2006), Theatre Lac-Brome and Centaur Theatre
 Down Our Way, and Up Yours (2007), Theatre Lac-Brome
 The 25th Century Belongs to Canada (2008), Theatre Lac-Brome and Centaur Theatre
 Schwartz's: The Musical (2011), Centaur Theatre
 The Last Night at the Gayety (2016), Centaur Theatre
Not Necessarily a Christmas Show (2019), BLVD Bar & Grill, Châteauguay
 ''Four Anglos Surviving the COVID Apocalypse (2021), Théâtre Lac-Brome, St Jax Montréal

References

External links
 Bowser & Blue official website
 
 

Musical groups established in 1978
Musical groups from Montreal
Canadian comedy musical groups
Comedians from Montreal
Canadian comedy duos
English-language musical groups from Quebec
Justin Time Records artists
1978 establishments in Quebec